Kandiga is a community in the Kassena Nankana Municipal District in the Upper East Region of Ghana.

Institution 

 Kandiga Community Senior High School

Notable native 

 Gordon Awandare

References 

Upper East Region
Communities in Ghana